Catocala dula is a moth of the family Erebidae. It is found in Russia, Japan, Korea and China.

The wingspan is about 65 mm.

Subspecies
Catocala dula dula
Catocala dula carminea (Mell, 1939)

References

External links
Catocala of Asia

dula
Moths of Asia
Moths described in 1861